Nawamin Deenoi (born 30 January 1999) is a Thai rower. He competed in the 2020 Summer Olympics.

References

1999 births
Living people
Rowers at the 2020 Summer Olympics
Nawamin Deenoi
Nawamin Deenoi
Rowers at the 2014 Asian Games